Senieji Trakai (literally: Old Trakai) is a historic Lithuanian village located  east of Trakai. According to the Lithuanian census of 2011, it has 1,396 inhabitants – Lithuanians, Poles and Russians. The Saint Petersburg–Warsaw Railway passes through Senieji Trakai.

The central part of the village is proclaimed an architectural reserve. The main street is dominated by uniform wooden houses, facing it with two-windowed sides.

Etymology 
The Trakai name, derived from  - "the glade", suggests that the castle was built in a hollow area after deforestation.

History

Grand Duke Gediminas 
Sometime before 1321, Grand Duke Gediminas transferred the capital of Lithuania from Kernavė to Trakai (today's Senieji Trakai) and erected his brick castle. In 1337 it became a seat of the newly established Duchy of Trakai.

Grand Duke Kęstutis 
Gediminas' son Kęstutis erected a new castle in New Trakai (today's Trakai). Kęstutis' son Vytautas was born in Old Trakai ca. 1350.

Destruction by the Teutonic Order in 1391 
The castle in Senieji Trakai was destroyed by the Teutonic Order in 1391.

Grand Duke Vytautas 
The ruins of the castle were donated to Benedictine monks by Vytautas in 1405. It is supposed that the present monastery building dating from the 15th century incorporates the remains of the Gediminas' castle.

References

About Senieji Trakai Elderate

Capitals of former nations
Villages in Vilnius County